St Margaret of Antioch is the Church of England parish church for Edgware. It is located at the junction of Watling Street and Station Road.

History
The church was first mentioned in the thirteenth century, where it was stated to be used by the Knights Hospitaller.
The tower dates from the fifteenth century. The remainder of the church is of red brick, and was largely rebuilt in 1764 and again in 1845.

It has been a Grade II listed building since 1950.

The Church also had a strong connection with the 2nd Edgware Scouts. The Group, which was formed in 1929, formerly had the title of "St. Margaret's" until the Group ceased to be sponsored by the Church in 1971, however the involvement between church and Scouts continued as did Church Parades.

References

External links 

Edgware
Churches in the London Borough of Barnet
Diocese of London
Grade II listed buildings in the London Borough of Barnet
Grade II listed churches in London
History of the London Borough of Barnet
Edgware